Viridiella is a genus of green algae in the class Trebouxiophyceae. , AlgaeBase accepted only one species in the genus, Viridiella fridericiana.

References

External links

Trebouxiophyceae genera
Trebouxiophyceae
Monotypic algae genera